Ardon or Ardón may refer to:

People
Last name
Gustavo Ardón, Honduran television presenter
Leslie Ardon (b. 1979), French basketball player
Mordecai Ardon (1896–1992), Israeli painter
Rick Ardon (b. 1959), Australian news presenter
Tyler Ardon, Canadian rugby sevens player who participated in the 2011 Pan American Games
Araceli Ardón (b. 1958), Mexican writer
Gabriel García Ardón, a member of the National Congress of Honduras in 2006–2010

First name
Ardon Bess, Canadian actor
Ardon Benjamin Holcomb, second husband (1856-1879) of Caroline Soule, American writer

Places
Populated places
Ardon, Loiret, a commune of the Loiret Département, France
Ardon, Jura, a commune of the Jura Département, France
Ardon, Russia, several inhabited localities in Russia
Ardon, Switzerland, a village in the Canton of Valais, Switzerland
Ardon, Iowa, a former townsite and unincorporated community in Iowa, United States
Ardón, a village in the Province of León, Spain

Other geographical features
Ardon (river), a river in the Republic of North Ossetia-Alania, Russia, which flows into the Terek
Har Ardon, a mountain in the protected area of Makhtesh Ramon, Israel

Other uses
Ardon, a world in the computer game Crusaders of Might and Magic

See also
Panic in the House of Ardon, a 1920 German silent crime film
Ardonsky (disambiguation)